HD 183144 is suspected variable star in the equatorial constellation of Aquila.  It is a hot giant star about 1,130 light years away.

Results from the MASCARA experiment indicate that HD 183144 is a pulsating variable star with a period of 0.3649 days, during which it varies by 0.01 magnitude in white light. It has a mass five times that of the Sun and, at an age of 160 million years, has already evolved away from the main sequence.

References

External links
 HR 7396
 Image HD 183144

Aquila (constellation)
Suspected variables
B-type giants
183144
7396
095664
Durchmusterung objects